A tidal tail is a thin, elongated region of stars and interstellar gas that extends into space from a galaxy. Tidal tails occur as a result of galactic tide forces between interacting galaxies. Examples of galaxies with tidal tails include the Tadpole Galaxy and the Mice Galaxies. Tidal forces can eject a significant amount of a galaxy's gas into the tail; within the Antennae Galaxies, for example, nearly half of the observed gaseous matter is found within the tail structures. Within those galaxies which have tidal tails, approximately 10% of the galaxy's stellar formation takes place in the tail. Overall, roughly 1% of all stellar formation in the known universe occurs within tidal tails.

Some interacting galaxy pairs have two distinct tails, as is the case for the Antennae Galaxies, while other systems have only one tail. Most tidal tails are slightly curved due to the rotation of the host galaxies. Those that are straight may actually be curved but still appear to be straight if they are being viewed edge-on.

History 
The phenomena now referred to as tidal tails were first studied extensively by Fritz Zwicky in 1953. Several astrophysicists expressed their doubts that these extensions could occur solely as the result of tidal forces, including Zwicky himself, who described his own views as "unorthodox". Boris Vorontsov-Velyaminov argued that the tails were too thin and too long (sometimes as large as 100,000 parsecs) to have been produced by gravity alone, as gravity should instead produce broad distortions. However, in 1972, renowned astronomer Alar Toomre proved that it was indeed tidal forces that were responsible for the tails.

Gallery

Notes